Joseph Issac Porter (born November 27, 1985) is a former American football cornerback. He was signed by the New Orleans Saints as an undrafted free agent in 2007. He played college football at Rutgers.

Born in Summit, New Jersey, Porter grew up in Franklin Township, Somerset County, New Jersey and played high school football at Franklin High School.

Porter has also played for the Green Bay Packers, Las Vegas Locomotives, Cleveland Browns and Oakland Raiders.

Oakland Raiders
Porter signed with the Oakland Raiders on January 4, 2011.  He was waived by the Oakland Raiders on October 17, 2011.

Personal life
Porter resides in New Jersey where he is a history teacher at West Windsor-Plainsboro High School South and was one at Franklin High School in Franklin Township, New Jersey, where he also coaches football and track & field.

Coaching career
Porter is currently coaching in Northern New Jersey with the private coaching service.

References

External links
Cleveland Browns bio
Green Bay Packers bio

1985 births
Living people
Franklin High School (New Jersey) alumni
Sportspeople from Franklin Township, Somerset County, New Jersey
Sportspeople from Summit, New Jersey
Players of American football from New Jersey
American football cornerbacks
Rutgers Scarlet Knights football players
New Orleans Saints players
Oakland Raiders players
Green Bay Packers players
Las Vegas Locomotives players
Cleveland Browns players